Carlos Daniel Cevada Teixeira (born 11 July 1994) is a Portuguese professional footballer who plays for C.D. Nacional as a winger.

Club career
Born in Figueira da Foz, Coimbra District, Daniel joined U.D. Leiria's youth system in 2009. On 14 May 2011, aged 16 years, 10 months and 3 days, he became the second youngest player to ever appear as a professional for the club, featuring eight minutes in a 3–3 Primeira Liga away draw against S.L. Benfica, whom he also represented for two years as a youth.

Daniel spent the second half of the 2012–13 season on loan at G.D. Tourizense, in the third division. Subsequently, he signed with C.S. Marítimo's reserves who competed in the second tier.

Daniel only played one competitive match with the first team during his spell at the Estádio do Marítimo, when he came on as a last-minute substitute in the 3–1 home win over F.C. Paços de Ferreira on 15 January 2017. He alternated between divisions two and three after leaving in the summer of 2018, representing in quick succession Leiria, C.D. Fátima, S.C. Beira-Mar and C.D. Mafra.

On 9 July 2021, aged 27, Daniel moved abroad for the first time, agreeing to a two-year contract at Wisła Puławy in the Polish II liga.

References

External links

National team data 

1994 births
Living people
People from Figueira da Foz
Sportspeople from Coimbra District
Portuguese footballers
Association football wingers
Primeira Liga players
Liga Portugal 2 players
Segunda Divisão players
U.D. Leiria players
G.D. Tourizense players
C.S. Marítimo players
C.D. Fátima players
S.C. Beira-Mar players
C.D. Mafra players
C.D. Nacional players
II liga players
Wisła Puławy players
Portugal youth international footballers
Portuguese expatriate footballers
Expatriate footballers in Poland
Portuguese expatriate sportspeople in Poland